The 1965 Grantland Rice Bowl was an NCAA College Division game following the 1965 season, between the Ball State Cardinals and the Tennessee A&I Tigers. Ball State quarterback Frank Houk was named the game's most outstanding player.

Notable participants
Multiple players from Tennessee A&I were selected in the 1966 NFL Draft – wide receiver Willie Walker, defensive tackle Franklin McRae, wide receiver Johnnie Robinson, and guard Jim Carer.  Ball State running back Jim Todd was also selected. Tennessee A&I players selected in later drafts include running back Bill Tucker and return specialist Noland Smith in the 1967 NFL/AFL Draft, also defensive end Claude Humphrey and quarterback Eldridge Dickey in the 1968 NFL/AFL Draft. Humphrey was inducted to the Pro Football Hall of Fame in 2014. Ball State quarterback Frank Houk was a 1985–86 inductee to his university's hall of fame.

Tennessee A&I head coach John Merritt was inducted to the College Football Hall of Fame in 1994.

Scoring summary

References

Further reading
 
  (video)

Grantland Rice Bowl
Grantland Rice Bowl
Ball State Cardinals football bowl games
Tennessee State Tigers football bowl games
Murfreesboro, Tennessee
December 1965 sports events in the United States
Grantland Rice